Elven may refer to:

 The adjectival form of Elf, in particular:
 Elven (comics), a 1994 four issue comic book written by Len Strazewski and drawn by Aaron Lopresti
 Elven Legacy, a 2009 PC video game
 Elven-languages created by J. R. R. Tolkien
 An alternate spelling of Elwen, derived therefrom:
 Elven, Morbihan, a town in Morbihan, France

See also
 Elvan (disambiguation)
 Elvin (disambiguation)
 Elfin (disambiguation)
 Eleven (disambiguation)